Kjetil Mårdalen (12 January 1925 – 4 November 1996) was a Norwegian nordic combined skier who competed in the 1950s. He won a bronze medal in the individual event at the 1954 FIS Nordic World Ski Championships in Falun.

Mårdalen finished 14th in the individual event at the 1956 Winter Olympics in Cortina d'Ampezzo.

References

Norwegian male Nordic combined skiers
Nordic combined skiers at the 1956 Winter Olympics
Olympic Nordic combined skiers of Norway
1925 births
1996 deaths
FIS Nordic World Ski Championships medalists in Nordic combined
20th-century Norwegian people